The Northeast version of the NWA World Tag Team Championship was the professional wrestling championship promoted by Toots Mondt's Manhattan Wrestling Enterprises and Capitol Wrestling Corporation.

Reigns

Reigns

References 

WWE tag team championships
National Wrestling Alliance championships